Bochold is a northwestern borough of the city of Essen, Germany. It was incorporated into the city in 1915. Before it had been part of the Bürgermeisterei Borbeck (Borbeck district). Around 18,200 people live here.

S-Bahn trains have a stop at Bergeborbeck station, which ist located in the Bochold borough. It should not be mixed up with the city of Bocholt,  to the northwest.

Geography 
Bochold borders the boroughs of Altenessen to the east, Nordviertel, Altendorf and Schönebeck to the south, Borbeck-Mitte in the west, and Bergeborbeck and Vogelheim in the north.

Sources 

Essen